Fukutin-related protein (FKRP) is also known as FKRP_HUMAN, LGMD2I, MDC1C, MDDGA5, MDDGB5, and MDDGC5. FKRP can be located in the brain, cardiac muscle and skeletal muscle, and in cells it is found in the Golgi apparatus. Fukutin is expressed in the mammalian retina and is located in the Golgi complex of retinal neurons.

The genomic location of the FKRP gene is on chromosome 19. FKRP is a ribitol-5-phosphate (enzyme) glycosyltranferase, which means this enzyme helps create glycosidic linkages to an acceptor. In glycosylation of α-dystroglycan (sugar chain) it adds a ribitol-5-phosphate onto the M3 core O-mannosylation of α-dystroglycan to create O-linked mannosylation. Without this linkage α-dystroglycan will not function properly, this can cause issues with the cytoskeleton, and extracellular matrix. In skeletal muscles the α-dystroglycan helps stabilize and protect muscle fibers, in the brain it directs movement of nerve cells. This could be caused by mutations that binds ribitol-5-phosphate to the α-dystroglycan incorrectly. These mutations have been found to be associated with congenital muscular dystrophy, dystroglycanopathies, and Walker-Warburg syndrome. The severity of these diseases are correlated to the amount of mutations occurring. Possible therapy options for FKRP mutations include small molecules, gene delivery, and cell therapy.

See also 
 Fukutin

References

External links 
  GeneReviews/NCBI/NIH/UW entry on Congenital Muscular Dystrophy Overview
 LOVD mutation database: FKRP